No Longer Home is an indie point-and-click adventure game developed by Humble Grove Studios and distributed by Fellow Traveller. The game was released in 2021 for the PC, Nintendo Switch Xbox One, and the Xbox Series platforms. It received mixed reviews on the Metacritic aggregator for the PC and Switch platforms. No Longer Home was nominated on The Game Award 2021 in the games for impact category.

References

2021 video games
Adventure games
Nintendo Switch games
Windows games
Point-and-click adventure games
Video games developed in the United Kingdom
Fellow Traveller games